This article contains information, results and statistics regarding the Australian national cricket team in the 2016 and 2016–17 cricket seasons. Statisticians class the 2016–17 season as matches played between May 2016 and April 2017.

Player contracts 
The 2016 - 17 list, or roster, was announced on 1 April 2016. Note that uncontracted players are still available to be selected to play for the national cricket team.

Match summary

2016 season

ODI Tri-Series in West Indies

2nd ODI

3rd ODI

4th ODI

5th ODI

7th ODI

8th ODI

Final

Tour of Sri Lanka

1st Test

2nd Test

3rd Test

1st ODI

2nd ODI

3rd ODI

4th ODI

5th ODI

1st T20I

2nd T20I

2016–17 season

ODI Series in South Africa

1st ODI

2nd ODI

3rd ODI

4th ODI

5th ODI

South Africa Test Series in Australia

1st Test

2nd Test

3rd Test

Pakistan tour in Australia

1st Test

2nd Test

3rd Test

1st ODI

2nd ODI

3rd ODI

4th ODI

5th ODI

ODI Series in New Zealand

1st ODI

2nd ODI

3rd ODI

Sri Lanka T20I Series in Australia

1st T20I

2nd T20I

3rd T20I

Test Series in India

1st Test

2nd Test

3rd Test 
Draw

4th Test

See also 
 Australia national cricket team

References 

2016-17